Aura Noir is a Norwegian black/thrash metal band from Oslo. Aura Noir is heavily influenced by early thrash bands such as Voivod, Slayer, Sodom and Kreator, to the latter they have also dedicated some of their songs. The band's main lyrical themes focus on blasphemy, death and aggression.

History
The band was formed in 1993 by Aggressor (Carl-Michael Eide) and Apollyon (Ole Jørgen Moe), who sent out a couple of demos before releasing the underground EP Dreams Like Deserts in 1995. In 1996, they were joined by Mayhem guitarist Blasphemer (Rune Eriksen), who contributed to the release of Black Thrash Attack, their first CD. 

In 2004, they were the first band to be signed to Tyrant Syndicate Productions, a sub-label of Peaceville Records, run by Nocturno Culto and Fenriz (both of Darkthrone). They released their next album The Merciless, which featured Nattefrost of Carpathian Forest and Fenriz on guest vocals.

The band was put on hold after Aggressor was in an accident in late March 2005. It is alleged that he either jumped or fell out from a fourth floor window, and landed on his legs after falling ten metres.  In May 2006, Aggressor appeared as a guest in the Norwegian radio programme Tinitus, where he confirmed he uses a wheelchair due to being paralyzed from the ankles down.  

Despite this setback, the band continued to record new material, which resulted in a new full-length album, Hades Rise, being released on 25 August 2008, and, as of 2010, has played several live gigs with a replacement drummer. At their 2011 gigs at Inferno and at the Party.San festival in Germany, Aggressor, still on crutches, joined them as the vocalist for several songs. He has since rejoined the band as a full-time recording and touring member on guitar and vocals, sitting on a stool on stage as he is still unable to walk or play drums.

The band signed with Norway's Indie Recordings in 2012 and released their fifth studio album, Out to Die, on 23 March 2012.

Members 
Aggressor (Carl-Michael Eide) – guitars, bass, drums (until 2005), vocals
Apollyon (Ole Jørgen Moe) – guitars, bass, drums, vocals
Blasphemer (Rune Eriksen) – guitars

Timeline

Discography 

Studio releases
Dreams Like Deserts (EP) (1995)
Black Thrash Attack (1996)
Deep Tracts of Hell (1998)
The Merciless (2004)
Hades Rise (2008)
Out to Die (2012)
Aura Noire (2018)

Compilations
Increased Damnation (2000)
Deep Dreams of Hell (2005)

Demos
Untitled (1993)
Two Voices, One King (1994)

Split albums
Überthrash (2004, 4-way split with Audiopain, Infernö and Nocturnal Breed)
Überthrash II (2005, 4-way split with Audiopain, Infernö and Nocturnal Breed)

References

External links
Official band website
Tyrant Syndicate Productions
Aura Noir at Encyclopaedia Metallum

Norwegian black metal musical groups
Norwegian thrash metal musical groups
Musical groups established in 1993
1993 establishments in Norway
Norwegian musical trios